The Bratislava Capitals were a professional Slovak ice hockey club based in Bratislava, Slovakia. They mostly played in the ICE Hockey League in Austria. The club was established in 2015 and ceased operations in 2022.

History
HC Bratislava was established in 2015 in response to the lack of a Bratislava senior team in Slovak competitions. In its first season in the second division, it finished 12th out of 16 teams. In the 2016/17 season, the club found a stable home in Vladimír Dzurilla Arena in Ružinov. The club stabilized, established itself in the second hockey league and finished fourth out of 20 teams. In 2019/20, the club went through a complete rebranding, changing its name to the Bratislava Capitals. That season, the team started playing its home games at Ondrej Nepela Arena, also known as Slovnaft Arena. 

After the 2019–20 season, the Capitals were accepted to play in the Austrian-based bet-at-home ICE Hockey League (formerly the Erste Bank Eishockey Liga) on 24 April 2020 beginning in the 2020/21 season. On November 19, 2021, the club suspended its season after 14 games, but announced its return for the 2022/23 season on May 16, 2022.

NHL alumni

  Stanislav Gron (2016–2018)
  Eric Selleck (2019–2020)
  Matt Climie (2019–2020)
  Sergei Kostitsyn (2020–2021)
  Jared Coreau (2020–2021)
  Brett Carson (2020–2021)
  Nikolay Zherdev (2021–2022)

References

External links
 Official website (Slovak)
 

Sport in Bratislava
Bratislava Capitals
2015 establishments in Slovakia